Hungry is the debut album by German power metal band Brainstorm, released in 1997.

On March 23, 2007, this album and Unholy were remastered by Achim Köhler and re-released by Metal Blade with six bonus tracks and a revised cover.

Track listing 
All music and lyrics by Brainstorm

 "Nails in My Hands" - 3:11
 "King of Fools" - 3:52
 "Innocent Until Caught" - 4:58
 "The Other Side" - 6:53
 "Tomorrow Never Comes" - 3:29
 "Liar's Edge" - 4:53
 "Tell-tale Heart" - 3:44
 "Welcome to the Darkside" - 5:10
 "Bring You Down"  - 4:20
 "Deep Down into Passion" - 4:36
 "Mr. Know-it-all" - 4:14

Remastered CD edition bonus tracks
 "Liar's Edge" (demo) - 4:55 
 "Live in Shame" (demo) - 4:22 
 "Kamikaze" - 5:43 
 "Up from the Ashes" - 3:15 
 "Blind" - 4:22 
 "Reach for the Sky"  - 5:07

Personnel

Band members
 Marcus Jürgens - lead vocals
 Torsten Ihlenfeld - guitars, keyboards
 Milan Loncaric - guitars
 Andreas Mailänder - bass
 Dieter Bernert - drums

Additional musicians
 Ralf Scheepers, Lee Tarot - backing vocals
 Michael Rodenberg - keyboards on remastered edition

Production
Peter Waschelewski - engineer, mixing
Michael Becker - mastering
Achim Köhler - re-mastering

References

1997 debut albums
Brainstorm (German band) albums